Pine Hill is a borough in Camden County, in the U.S. state of New Jersey. As of the 2020 United States census, the borough's population was 10,743, an increase of 510 (+5.0%) from the 2010 census count of 10,233, which in turn reflected a decline of 647 (−5.9%) from the 10,880 counted in the 2000 census.

Pine Hill was created on April 23, 1929, from Clementon Township, one of seven municipalities created from the now-defunct township, and one of five new municipalities, including Hi-Nella Borough, Lindenwold Borough, Pine Valley Borough, and Somerdale Borough, created on that same date. Earlier known as Mont Ararat or Clementon Heights, the name "Pine Hill" was chosen to reflects the trees and terrain of the area.

The borough of Pine Valley agreed to be absorbed into Pine Hill in 2021. The merger took effect on January 1, 2022, adding $20 million in taxable property and the famed golf course into Pine Hill.

The borough had the 16th-highest property tax rate in New Jersey, with an equalized rate of 4.520% in 2020, compared to 3.470% in the county as a whole and a statewide average of 2.279%.

Geography
According to the U.S. Census Bureau, the borough had a total area of 3.95 square miles (10.24 km2), including 3.91 square miles (10.13 km2) of land and 0.04 square miles (0.11 km2) of water (1.06%). The borough borders Berlin Borough, Clementon Borough, Gloucester Township, Lindenwold, and Winslow Township.

Demographics

2010 census

The Census Bureau's 2006–2010 American Community Survey showed that, in 2010 inflation-adjusted dollars, median household income was $53,236 with a margin of error of +/− $3,808, and the median family income was $71,789 (+/− $4,439). Males had a median income of $47,094 (+/− $3,168) versus $41,711 (+/− $3,474) for females. The per capita income for the borough was $24,610 (+/− $1,792). About 11.0% of families and 13.8% of the population were below the poverty line, including 19.1% of those under age 18 and 10.3% of those age 65 or over.

2000 census
As of the 2000 United States census, there were 10,880 people, 4,214 households, and 2,743 families residing in the borough. The racial makeup of the borough was 76.79% White, 18.35% African American, 0.28% Native American, 1.41% Asian, 0.02% Pacific Islander, 1.21% from other races, and 1.95% from two or more races. Hispanic or Latino of any race were 3.64% of the population.

There were 4,214 households, out of which 35.5% had children under the age of 18 living with them, 42.9% were married couples living together, 16.9% had a female householder with no husband present, and 34.9% were non-families. 27.8% of all households were made up of individuals, and 7.8% had someone living alone who was 65 years of age or older. The average household size was 2.58 and the average family size was 3.18.

In the borough, the population was spread out, with 27.2% under the age of 18, 9.2% from 18 to 24, 34.9% from 25 to 44, 20.2% from 45 to 64, and 8.5% who were 65 years of age or older. The median age was 33 years. For every 100 females, there were 90.2 males. For every 100 females age 18 and over, there were 85.8 males.

The median income for a household in the borough was $42,035, and the median income for a family was $50,040. Males had a median income of $36,277 versus $29,826 for females. The per capita income for the borough was $18,613. About 5.9% of families and 7.1% of the population were below the poverty line, including 8.9% of those under age 18 and 6.7% of those age 65 or over.

Government

Local government
Pine Hill is governed under the Borough form of New Jersey municipal government, which is used in 218 municipalities (of the 564) statewide, making it the most common form of government in New Jersey. The governing body is comprised of a Mayor and a Borough Council, with all positions elected at-large on a partisan basis as part of the November general election. A Mayor is elected directly by the voters to a four-year term of office. The Borough Council is comprised of six members elected to serve three-year terms on a staggered basis, with two seats coming up for election each year in a three-year cycle. The Borough form of government used by Pine Hill is a "weak mayor / strong council" government in which council members act as the legislative body with the mayor presiding at meetings and voting only in the event of a tie. The mayor can veto ordinances subject to an override by a two-thirds majority vote of the council. The mayor makes committee and liaison assignments for council members, and most appointments are made by the mayor with the advice and consent of the council.

, the Mayor of Pine Hill Borough is Democrat Christopher Green, whose term of office ends December 31, 2023. Members of the Pine Hill Borough Council are Terence G. "Terry" Burke (D, 2022), Patricia L. Corry-Gaft (D, 2023), Charles W. Jaxel Jr. (D, 2023), Thomas B. Knott (D, 2024), John J. Robb (D, 2024) and Charles E. Warrington Jr. (D, 2022).

Federal, state, and county representation
Pine Hill is located in the 1st Congressional District and is part of New Jersey's 8th state legislative district.

Politics
As of March 2011, there were a total of 6,425 registered voters in Pine Hill, of which 2,586 (40.2%) were registered as Democrats, 634 (9.9%) were registered as Republicans and 3,201 (49.8%) were registered as Unaffiliated. There were 4 voters registered as Libertarians or Greens.

In the 2012 presidential election, Democrat Barack Obama received 74.8% of the vote (3,087 cast), ahead of Republican Mitt Romney with 23.9% (987 votes), and other candidates with 1.3% (52 votes), among the 4,162 ballots cast by the borough's 6,965 registered voters (36 ballots were spoiled), for a turnout of 59.8%. In the 2008 presidential election, Democrat Barack Obama received 70.4% of the vote (3,029 cast), ahead of Republican John McCain, who received around 26.2% (1,127 votes), with 4,304 ballots cast among the borough's 6,203 registered voters, for a turnout of 69.4%. In the 2004 presidential election, Democrat John Kerry received 65.5% of the vote (2,578 ballots cast), outpolling Republican George W. Bush, who received around 32.9% (1,294 votes), with 3,936 ballots cast among the borough's 5,912 registered voters, for a turnout percentage of 66.6.

In the 2013 gubernatorial election, Republican Chris Christie received 51.4% of the vote (988 cast), ahead of Democrat Barbara Buono with 46.9% (903 votes), and other candidates with 1.7% (33 votes), among the 1,966 ballots cast by the borough's 7,046 registered voters (42 ballots were spoiled), for a turnout of 27.9%. In the 2009 gubernatorial election, Democrat Jon Corzine received 55.4% of the vote (1,165 ballots cast), ahead of both Republican Chris Christie with 36.6% (769 votes) and Independent Chris Daggett with 4.9% (102 votes), with 2,103 ballots cast among the borough's 6,369 registered voters, yielding a 33.0% turnout.

Education
The Pine Hill Schools serve public school students in pre-kindergarten through twelfth grade. As of the 2018–19 school year, the district, comprised of four schools, had an enrollment of 1,899 students and 168.6 classroom teachers (on an FTE basis), for a student–teacher ratio of 11.3:1. Schools in the district (with 2018–19 enrollment data from the National Center for Education Statistics) are Dr. Albert Bean Elementary School with 370 students in grades Pre-K–5, John H. Glenn Elementary School with 453 students in grades Pre-K–5, Pine Hill Middle School with 377 students in grades 6–8, and Overbrook High School with 656 students in grades 9–12.

Following the dissolution of the Lower Camden County Regional School District, Overbrook High School became part of the Pine Hill district as of September 2001, with students from Berlin Township and Clementon attending the school as part of sending/receiving relationships.

Transportation

Roads and highways

County Route 534 is the only significant roadway serving Pine Hill directly, running  through the borough.

Public transportation
NJ Transit bus service between Turnersville and Camden is available on the 403 route.

Notable people

People who were born in, residents of, or otherwise closely associated with Pine Hill include:
 Ron Dayne (born 1978), former NFL running back who won the 1999 Heisman Trophy
 Peter DeMarco (1932–2005), physician who specialized in regenerative medicine
 Jermaine Jones (born 1986), who competed on the eleventh season of American Idol
 John Vukovich (1947–2007), professional baseball utility infielder, manager and coach

References

External links

 Official Pine Hill website

 
1929 establishments in New Jersey
Borough form of New Jersey government
Boroughs in Camden County, New Jersey
Mergers of administrative divisions in the United States
Populated places established in 1929